Werner Otto (born 15 April 1948) is a retired track cyclist from East Germany. He competed in the 2000 m tandem at the 1968 and 1972 Olympics and won a silver medal in 1972, alongside Jürgen Geschke; they finished fifth in 1968. At the world championships Otto and Geschke won two gold, one silver and one bronze medal in 1969–1973.

References

External links

 databaseOlympics

1948 births
Living people
East German male cyclists
Cyclists at the 1968 Summer Olympics
Cyclists at the 1972 Summer Olympics
Olympic cyclists of East Germany
Olympic silver medalists for East Germany
Cyclists from Dresden
Olympic medalists in cycling
Medalists at the 1972 Summer Olympics
People from Bezirk Dresden